John Theryll Knox  (September 30, 1924 – April 3, 2017) was an American politician and lawyer.

He served in the California State Assembly for the 11th district and as Speaker Pro Tempore. He was a Democrat.

Knox was born in Reno, Nevada and moved to California with his parents in 1929. He served in the United States Army Air Forces during World War II. He received his bachelor's degree from Occidental College and his law degree from University of California, Hastings College of the Law. Knox was admitted to the California bar in 1953 and practiced law in Richmond, California. He died at a hospital in Richmond, California after a long illness.

Legislative Career 
Knox served in the California Assembly from 1960 to 1980, acting as Assembly speaker from 1976-1980. During this time, he championed major legislation such as the California Environmental Quality Act (CEQA).

Legacy
A portion of Interstate 580 is called the John T. Knox Freeway.

References

1924 births
2017 deaths
Politicians from Richmond, California
Politicians from Reno, Nevada
United States Army Air Forces soldiers
Military personnel from California
Occidental College alumni
University of California, Hastings College of the Law alumni
California lawyers
United States Army personnel of World War II
Democratic Party members of the California State Assembly
20th-century American lawyers